Ramsgate  is a seaside town on the South coast of England.

Ramsgate may also refer to:

Ramsgate, KwaZulu-Natal, a town in South Africa
Ramsgate, New South Wales, a suburb of Sydney, Australia

See also
Town of Ramsgate, a pub in Wapping, East London, England